Lawrence West is a subway station on Line 1 Yonge–University in Toronto, Ontario, Canada. It is located in the median of William R. Allen Road at Lawrence Avenue West. The station serves the local communities of Lawrence Heights, Lawrence Manor and Glen Park, and nearby destinations such as the Columbus Centre, Lawrence Heights Community Recreation Centre and Lawrence Allen Centre. Wi-Fi service is available at this station. The station has a Gateway Newstands in the paid area of the south side area.

History

In 2008, the Toronto Star reported this station, along with Lansdowne, Kennedy, and Warden to be a "known problem area" in terms of crime in the subway system.

In 2014 an elevator, automatic sliding doors and an accessible fare gate were installed in the main part of the station on the south side of Lawrence Avenue, to make the station wheelchair accessible. In addition, repairs were made to the sawtooth bus platforms and the roadway was repaved for low floor buses. The northside entrance remains inaccessible due to space restrictions and generally used as drop off point by car.

On 6 January 2019, this station discontinued sales of legacy TTC fare media (tokens and tickets), previously available at a fare collector booth. Presto vending machines were available to sell Presto cards and to load funds or a monthly Metropass onto them.

On 5 April 2019, Lawrence West and  stations became the first two locations to sell single-use Presto tickets, which are sold from the stations' Presto fare vending machines.

Architecture and art

Dunlop Farrow Aitken was the firm responsible for the station's architecture. The structure is composed of an enclosed train platform area in the median of Allen Road, which is bridged by a bus loop and waiting area on the south side of the Lawrence Avenue bridge. Staffed entrances on both sides of the street connect to a transfer area which links the train platform and the bus area.

Upon entrance from the Lawrence Avenue bridge over Allen Road, the bus waiting area and the train platform are apparent. This openness is achieved through glazed walls and a large stairwell. The glass is framed with distinctive orange-painted metal. The platform level features exposed concrete walls, with a long strip of skylights above the tracks with the same orange framing used throughout the station. Rectangular prism benches with rectangular tiles of yellow, orange, and brown hues are unique to the station. Similar tiles are used on the floors and centre pillars.

Spacing... Aerial Highways, a large 300 foot ceramic tile mural designed by Claude Breeze, spreads across the north face of the main station building above the bus platform.

Surface connections 

When the subway is closed, buses use stops outside of the terminal along Lawrence Avenue West. TTC routes serving the station include:

References

External links 

Line 1 Yonge–University stations
Railway stations in Canada opened in 1978
Railway stations in highway medians